Dene Miller (born ) is a former Scotland international rugby league footballer who played in the 2000s. He played at club level for the St Albans Centurions and the London Skolars.

Background
Dene Miller was born in Welwyn Garden City, Hertfordshire, England, he has Scottish ancestors, and eligible to play for Scotland due to the grandparent rule.

Playing career

International honours
Dene Miller won a cap for Scotland whilst at St Albans Centurions in 2006 against Wales (sub).

Club career
Dene Miller signed for London Skolars making his début in the Northern Rail cup against holders Leigh Centurions, he became the first player at the London Skolars to win the Northern Rail "player of the round" award after scoring a hat-trick of tries against Sheffield Eagles in the group stages.

References

External links
Centurions 0-72 Crusaders
Barrow thump sorry London Skolars
Henderson trio in Scots cup squad
Scots In Exile
Five Debutants For Wales Clash
Miller Makes Pro Debut
Scotland Win Bowl At London MX9s

1981 births
English people of Scottish descent
Living people
London Skolars players
Scotland national rugby league team players
St Albans Centurions players
Sportspeople from Welwyn Garden City
Rugby league players from Hertfordshire